is a 1999 Japanese mock documentary film centering on the adult video (AV) industry which was written and directed by Shungo Kaji. Ekiben refers to a box lunch sold at train stations in Japan and it is also a slang term referring to a sexual position where the man remains standing while supporting the woman who faces him with her legs wrapped around his waist. This position is the "specialty" of the adult video actor Chocoball Mukai who appears in the film.

The movie stars Shungo Kaji, Saki Shiratori and Chocoball Mukai. It was released theatrically in Japan as an R-15 film on October 9, 1999, by Hot Entertainment. The film was screened in February 2000 at the Berlin International Film Market (part of the Berlin International Film Festival) and in March 2000 at the NatFilm Festival in Denmark.

The critic for Variety says the film could, with judicious editing and marketing, have a "brief specialized career." He calls it inventive and funny, well acted and observed and he finds Kaji's aspiration to be taken seriously as a director touching with "a curiously melancholic style of humor." The AllRovi entry describes it as a "funny and oddly poignant film."

Notes

Bibliography
 
 
 
 

1990s Japanese films
1990s Japanese-language films
1999 films
1990s mockumentary films